William Baldwin (born 1963) is an American actor.

William Baldwin may also refer to:

William Baldwin (author) ( 1547), English author of Beware the Cat, arguably the first novel in English
William Baldwin (Jesuit) (1563–1632), English Jesuit
William Warren Baldwin (1775–1844), Canadian politician
William Baldwin (botanist) (1779–1819), American botanist and doctor
William Edwin Baldwin (1827–1864), American Civil War Confederate army officer
William Henry Baldwin (1827–1894), shipbuilder from Quebec
William Baldwin (Maryland politician) (died 1895), American politician
William Baldwin (New Zealand politician) (1838–1917), New Zealand politician
William Delavan Baldwin (1856–1930), American chairman of Otis Elevator
William Woodward Baldwin (1862–1954), U.S. Third Assistant Secretary of State
William Henry Baldwin Jr. (1863–1905), American railroad executive of the Long Island Railroad
William E. Baldwin (politician) (born 1948), Pennsylvanian politician
William Baldwin (journalist) (born 1951), American business journalist

See also
Billy Baldwin (disambiguation)
William Bawdwen (1762–1816), English antiquary